Tom Burke (born 30 June 1981) is an English actor. He is best known for his roles as Athos in the 2014–2016 BBC series The Musketeers, Dolokhov in the 2016 BBC literary-adaptation miniseries War & Peace, the eponymous character Cormoran Strike in the 2017–2022 BBC series Strike and Orson Welles in the 2020 film Mank.

Early life
Burke was born in London and grew up in Kent. His parents, David Burke and Anna Calder-Marshall, are also actors, as were his godparents, Alan Rickman and Bridget Turner. His maternal grandparents were writers Arthur Calder-Marshall and Ara Calder-Marshall. Burke was born with a cleft lip and had reconstructive surgery.

Burke always wanted to become an actor. He attended the National Youth Theatre, the Young Arden Theatre in Faversham, and the Box Clever Theatre Company performing at the Marlowe Theatre in Canterbury, and participated in the plays his parents staged in their hometown.

As a child, Burke was diagnosed with dyslexia and struggled academically. He left school before his A-levels because he "couldn't stand the idea of that" and thought he "wouldn't survive it". As soon as he left school at 17, he wrote to an acting agency and got the first role he auditioned for. He attended dance school before being accepted at the Royal Academy of Dramatic Art (RADA) in London when he was 18.

Career
Burke's first role was as Roland in 1999's Dragonheart: A New Beginning, a direct-to-video sequel of the 1996 film Dragonheart. That year he appeared in an episode of the series Dangerfield and the television movie All the King's Men. After graduating from RADA, he started working steadily in television, film and theatre.

Television
His first television part after drama school was Syd in the Paul Abbott thriller series State of Play, starring John Simm, Bill Nighy and James McAvoy. In 2004 he played Lee in TV film Bella and the Boys. In 2005 he played the 20-year-old version of Giacomo Casanova's son, Giac, in the television adaptation of Casanova, starring David Tennant and Peter O'Toole.

In 2006, he played Dr. John Seward in the TV film Dracula. In 2007 he played Napoleon Bonaparte in an episode of BBC's docudrama Heroes and Villains and had a small part as a book publisher in the satirical drama The Trial of Tony Blair. In 2009 he played Lieutenant Race in an episode of the 12th series of Agatha Christie's Poirot. In 2011 he played Bentley Drummle in two episodes of BBC's adaptation of Charles Dickens' Great Expectations. In 2012 he became a regular cast member in the second series of BBC Two's The Hour as journalist Bill Kendall. From 2014 to 2016, he played Athos on the BBC One series The Musketeers, an adaptation of Alexandre Dumas' The Three Musketeers. He also plays Cormoran Strike in the BBC miniseries Strike, based on the detective novels of Robert Galbraith; and Rebrov in Sky TV's The Lazarus Project which will air in the U.S. on the TNT cable network.

Films
In 2004 Burke had his first cinema part in The Libertine. In 2007 he played an aspiring filmmaker who ends up directing a porn film in the comedy I Want Candy. In 2008 he played Bluey in Donkey Punch, a horror thriller that debuted at the 2008 Sundance Film Festival. In 2009 he played Geoff Goddard in Telstar: The Joe Meek Story, and had a small part in Stephen Frears' Chéri. In 2010 he played Davy in Third Star, a drama starring Benedict Cumberbatch, JJ Feild and Adam Robertson which follows a trip four friends, one of them terminally ill, make to Barafundle Bay in Wales.

In 2012 he played Mark in Cleanskin. In 2013 he played Billy, the older brother of Ryan Gosling's character in Only God Forgives, directed by Nicolas Winding Refn. That year he had a supporting role in the Ralph Fiennes-directed film The Invisible Woman.

In 2020, he played American filmmaker Orson Welles in David Fincher's Netflix original film Mank, opposite Gary Oldman as Herman J. Mankiewicz. He will also star in English director and photographer Mitch Jenkins's film The Show (written by Alan Moore) as private investigator Fletcher Dennis. In November 2021, Burke joined Anya Taylor-Joy and Chris Hemsworth in the Mad Max: Fury Road spinoff film Furiosa, replacing Yahya Abdul-Mateen II, who had to drop out due to scheduling conflicts.

Theatre
As a theatre actor, Burke has worked with the Royal Shakespeare Company and has appeared in plays at Shakespeare's Globe, playing Romeo in Romeo and Juliet in 2004; at the Old Vic in Noël Coward's Design for Living opposite Andrew Scott and Lisa Dillon in 2010; and at the Almeida Theatre playing Greg in reasons to be pretty in 2011. In 2002 he played Hamlet in Howard Barker's Gertrude – The Cry, a reworking of Shakespeare's Hamlet which focuses on the character of Gertrude, the protagonist's mother.

In 2006 he worked with Ian McKellen in the play The Cut. In 2008 he played Adolph in Creditors at the Donmar Warehouse. Actor  Alan Rickman, Burke's godfather, staged the play which earned Burke an Ian Charleson Award. The play subsequently premiered at the Brooklyn Academy of Music in New York in 2010. In 2012 he played Louis Dubedat in The Doctor's Dilemma at the National Theatre.

Filmography

Film

Television

Theatre

Awards and nominations

References

External links

 Tom Burke at the British Film Institute

1981 births
Ian Charleson Award winners
Alumni of RADA
English male television actors
English male stage actors
English male voice actors
English male Shakespearean actors
Living people
20th-century English male actors
21st-century English male actors
English male film actors
Male actors from Kent
National Youth Theatre members
Actors with dyslexia
Calder Marshall family